Athipotta is a small village near Alathur in the Palakkad district of Kerala state, south India. It's about 30 km from Palakkad town and 10 km from Alathur. The location was called South Malabar by the British Colonial administration.

Economy
Traditionally, the primary economic activity of this village has been rice cultivation, manufacturing of ceramic tiles and vegetable farming. More recently, there has been a shift towards private, commercial enterprises such as textile shops, grocery shops and telecommunication units. Being a small unit of political administration, a Panchayat, the local government is run by various representatives of the village.

Religious place
Athipotta is famous for the Mangottu Kavu Temple. The village activities are centered on this Hindu temple. There has been continuous progress at the temple and in the village  due to the influx of devotees from around the world.

Transportation
Athipotta has access to two airports, Coimbatore, Tamil Nadu and Kochi/Cochin International Airport.

Athipotta is a wholesome village famous for variety of rich cultural canons with high order of traditional values.

Etymology
The name 'Athipotta' believed to be derived from a Sanskrit term 'Hasti' in combination with a vernacular term 'Potta'. ‘Hasti’ means elephant and ‘Potta’ means a flat terrain or an upland. Thus, an upland enriched with higher traditional standards.

Temples

The VELA festival of Athipotta Sree Mangottu Bhagavathy Kshetram is celebrated in strict traditional manner with all pomp & show, that begins from the day of Vishu every year. With the splendid celebration of Thaalappoli at Athipotta Sree Kurumbha Bhavathy Kshetram on first Sunday following Vishu, the full-fledged Vela festivities begin... Next day, i.e. Monday, which is the day of 'Karikkali' [cultural folk dance performed to please the Lord Shiva & Shakti], the Koti-Koora for Vela is hoisted up the temple KodiMaram. 'Chamannju Kali' in continuation of 'Karikkali' is solemnized next day (Tuesday)in the premise of Temple. Next day - Wednesday - Kummaatti is played by the Desam who gathered below the Raavandath-Aalthara-Mannam. Customarily; these Karikkali, Chamannjukali and Kummatti are performed by the male-members of Nair Samudaayam and Mannadiar samudayam. This is an age-old conventional practice regarded by one and all in the Village.

The lyrics of songs sung while playing Karikkali & Chamannjuakali (generally known as MalamakKali or KanyaarKali) were written by some great scholars from among our highly intellect ancestors. From the unique terminology used in these lyrics, it transpires that this would have been written sometime around AD 900+. The songs mainly are in adoration to Lord Shiva, Goddess Devi, Subramanyar, Sun, Moon, Nature, and so forth. Of course, many of its lines have innate essence of Vedic as well as philosophical doctrines, too.

Extracting the exact interpretation out of these most significant lyrics is somewhat a tough task for the present generation. Still..., the devotional performance arts -  dance form - is followed intact by the generations with due dedication. After Kummaatti, Thursday to Saturday, another temple-art-form, widely known as Tholppaava Kooth, (Puppet-Shadow-Play)is executed by the expert Pulavar inside the KoothumaaDdam beside Maangottukaavu. Wherein, whole story of the Holy Raamaayanam is narrated and played in a distinct fashion using these Puppets to portray different character(s) of the epic. And, on Sunday, the VELA is celebrated with variety of colorful programs such as, Vaadyam, Elephant procession, Poothan-Thira, Pon-kuthira, Thaalappoli, etc. etc. This comes to an end by Monday morning with a great episode of fireworks. The villagers relax for another 3–4 days. On the ensuing Friday & Saturdays (during night hours) Kanyaar-Kali takes places in front of Sree Kurumbha Kaavu, beneath a well-decorated marquee illuminated with Deepams. And finally on Sunday, the KodikKoora that hoisted on the day of Karikkalli, would be pulled down duly observing all systematic observances. As soon as the Koti-koora is pulled down, distribution of the Desa-Paayasam goes on among the villagers and visitors, above the Aalthara in the close vicinity of Sree Mangottu Kaavu. That night also, KanyaarKali is played by the Mannadiar men in front of Moola-Sthaanam from where the Vela procession begins every year.
Apart from above, except monsoon, all through the year, series of several edifying programs and social activities are held in this green village.   
All those who respect our traditions and love folklore art forms as well as temple arts are cordially invited to visit this dazzlingly magnificent village - ATHIPOTTA !!!
The enchanting  and historic river GAAYATRI brooks alongside Athipotta!

References

Villages in Palakkad district